The 2013 Democratic Party leadership election was an open primary election held in November–December 2013. After having come first in the vote by party members, Matteo Renzi was elected by a landslide 68% in a three-way primary on 8 December.

Electoral process
Candidates were required to file their candidacies by 11 October 2013.

Between 14 October and 6 November local and provincial conventions took place all around the country. Between 7 and 17 November party members voted on the candidates for secretary. Under party rules the candidates who receive the support of at least the 15% of voting party members in local conventions or the three most voted candidates with at least 5% of the vote, qualify for the second round of the race and have the chance to present their platform at the national convention.

The national convention, which took place on 24–25 November, declared the candidates who will run in an open primary on 8 December. Voters will elect also the national assembly of the party and the regional secretaries and assemblies. If no candidate got more than 50% of the vote, a run-off between the two most voted candidates would take place in the national assembly, scheduled within two weeks from the primary election.

Candidates
Four individuals filed their candidacy for becoming secretary of the party:
Pippo Civati (campaign website, platform) — The main themes of Civati, a former Democrat of the Left, included participatory democracy, environmentalism, democratic socialism, secularism, social liberalism, international development and pacifism. Civati, whose views were somewhat close to those of Stefano Rodotà, was a proponent of an alliance with the Five Star Movement, instead of continuing the coalition government with the centre-right People of Freedom.
Gianni Cuperlo (campaign website, platform) — A former member of the Italian Communist Party and the Democrats of the Left, Cuperlo was the candidate of the party's social-democratic establishment, including Massimo D'Alema and Pier Luigi Bersani.
Gianni Pittella (campaign website, platform) — Pittella, a former member of the Italian Socialist Party and the Democrats of the Left, had his electoral strength in Southern Italy, where he was thrice elected to the European Parliament, of which he had been Vice President since 2009.
Matteo Renzi (campaign website, platform) — Raised in a Christian Democratic household, formed in the Association of Italian Catholic Guides and Scouts and entered in politics with the Italian People's Party, Renzi represented the party's right-wing and proposed mostly liberal views. As such, he was often compared to Tony Blair, the key figure of New Labour. Elected mayor of Florence in 2009, Renzi had come to public notoriety as the "Scrapper" of the party's establishment and of many centre-left traditional positions as well.

Opinion polls

Results

Vote by party members

Source: Official results

Renzi, Cuperlo and Civati were admitted to the primary election, while Pittella was excluded.

Primary election

Source: Semi-official results

Delegates summary

Results by Regions
Renzi won an absolute majority in all regions. Only among voters living abroad he won merely a plurality (47.1%). His strongest performances were in his homeregion Tuscany (78.4%) and neighbouring Marche (76.3%) and Umbria (74.5%), the weakest in Sardinia (56.0%). Cuperlo performed strongest in the southern regions of Calabria (34.2%) and Basilicata (33.7%), and weakest in Marche (10.7%). Civati had his strongest results among expatriates (22.3%), in Aosta Valley (20.7%), Trentino (20.5%) and Sardinia (19.6%), the weakest in the southern region of Basilicata (8.0%).

Generally speaking, Renzi and Civati did better in central–northern Italy, Cuperlo in the South.

References

External links
Official website of the Democratic Party
Official website of the leadership election

2013 elections in Italy
Political party leadership elections in Italy
Democratic Party (Italy)
November 2013 events in Italy
December 2013 events in Italy
Democratic Party (Italy) leadership election